Nicolae Lahovary, 1887-1972, was a Romanian diplomat. He was minister plenipotentiary to Albania (1934–1936) and to Switzerland from 1940-1944 before being replaced by Vespasian Pella. In his capacity of envoy to Switzerland he was active in contacts with the representatives of the allies for ensuring an armistice. After he was recalled in 1944, he settled in Switzerland, where he was an active member of the Romanian exile.

Nicolae Lahovary also was an anthropologist. His main work “Dravidian Origins and the West” was published in Bombay posthumously in 1963.

References
George G. Potra - Reacţii necunoscute la demiterea lui Titulescu - 29 August 1936: O "mazilire perfida"

Dumitru Paraschiv - Legatia Romaniei de la Berna impotriva revizionismului ungar (III) – Tricolorul Nr. 811, Nov. 20, 2006
Constantin Moşincat – Un eveniment  - Un Ordin - Crişana August 23, 2007 
Adrian Porucic – Contribuţia lui Gheorghe Ivănescu în în domeniul studiilor indo-europene 
Cicerone Ioanitoiu – Sovieticii se apropie de graniţele României  

Romanian diplomats
1887 births
1972 deaths